The 1991 Broadland District Council election took place on 2 May 1991 to elect members of Broadland District Council in England. This was on the same day as other local elections.

Election result

References

1991 English local elections
May 1991 events in the United Kingdom
1991
1990s in Norfolk